Onur Kurt born 18 July 1992 is a Turkish volleyball player, who competes for Beşiktaş JK.

References

External links 

 

1992 births
Living people
Volleyball players from Istanbul
Turkish men's volleyball players
21st-century Turkish people